Reforestation (occasionally, reafforestation) is the natural or intentional restocking of existing forests and woodlands (forestation) that have been depleted, usually through deforestation but also after clearcutting.

Management 
A debated issue in managed reforestation is whether or not the succeeding forest will have the same biodiversity as the original forest. If the forest is replaced with only one species of tree and all other vegetation is prevented from growing back, a monoculture forest similar to agricultural crops would be the result. However, most reforestation involves the planting of different selections of seedlings taken from the area, often of multiple species. Another important factor is the natural regeneration of a wide variety of plant and animal species that can occur on a clear cut. In some areas the suppression of forest fires for hundreds of years has resulted in large single aged and single species forest stands. The logging of small clear cuts, and/or prescribed burning, actually increases the biodiversity in these areas by creating a greater variety of tree stand ages and species.

Over 90% of the world's forests regenerate organically, and more than half are covered by forest management plans or equivalents.

For harvesting 

Reforestation is not only used for recovery of accidentally destroyed forests. In some countries, such as Finland, many of the forests are managed by the wood products and pulp and paper industry. In such an arrangement, like other crops, trees are planted to replace those that have been cut. The Finnish Forest Act from 1996 obliges the forest to be replanted after felling. In such circumstances, the industry can cut the trees in a way to allow easier reforestation. The wood products industry systematically replaces many of the trees it cuts, employing large numbers of summer workers for tree planting work. For example, in 2010, Weyerhaeuser reported planting 50 million seedlings. However replanting an old-growth forest with a plantation is not replacing the old with the same characteristics in the new.

In just 20 years, a teak plantation in Costa Rica can produce up to about 400 m³ of wood per hectare. As the natural teak forests of Asia become more scarce or difficult to obtain, the prices commanded by plantation-grown teak grows higher every year. Other species, such as mahogany, grow more slowly than teak in Tropical America but are also extremely valuable. Faster growers include pine, eucalyptus, and Gmelina.

Reforestation, if several indigenous species are used, can provide other benefits in addition to financial returns, including restoration of the soil, rejuvenation of local flora and fauna, and the capturing and sequestering of 38 tons of carbon dioxide per hectare per year.

The reestablishment of forests is not just simple tree planting. Forests are made up of a community of species and they build dead organic matter into soils over time. A major tree-planting program could enhance the local climate and reduce the demands of burning large amounts of fossil fuels for cooling in the summer.

For climate change mitigation 

Forests are an important part of the global carbon cycle because trees and plants absorb carbon dioxide through photosynthesis. Therefore, they play an important role in climate change mitigation. By removing the greenhouse gas carbon dioxide from the air, forests function as terrestrial carbon sinks, meaning they store large amounts of carbon. At any time, forests account for as much as double the amount of carbon in the atmosphere. Forests remove around three billion tons of carbon every year. This amounts to about 30% of anthropogenic all carbon dioxide emissions. Therefore, an increase in the overall forest cover around the world would mitigate global warming.

At the beginning of the 21st century, interest in reforestation grew over its potential to mitigate climate change. Even without displacing agriculture and cities, earth can sustain almost one billion hectares of new forests. This would remove 25% of carbon dioxide from the atmosphere and reduce its concentration to levels that existed in the early 20th century. A temperature rise of 1.5 degrees would reduce the area suitable for forests by 20% by the year 2050, because some tropical areas will become too hot. The countries that have the most forest-ready land are: Russia, Canada, Brazil, Australia, the United States and China.

The four major strategies are:

 Increase the amount of forested land through reforestation
 Increase density of existing forests at a stand and landscape scale
 Expand the use of forest products that sustainably replace fossil-fuel emissions
 Reduce carbon emissions caused by deforestation and degradation

Implementing the first strategy is supported by many organizations around the world. For example, in China, the Jane Goodall Institute, through their Shanghai Roots & Shoots division, launched the Million Tree Project in Kulun Qi, Inner Mongolia to plant one million trees. China used 24 million hectares of new forest to offset 21% of Chinese fossil fuel emissions in 2000. In Java, Indonesia newlywed couples give whoever is conducting their wedding 5 seedlings. Each divorcing couple gives 25 seedlings to whoever divorces them. Costa Rica doubled its forest cover in 30 years using its system of grants and other payments for environmental services, including compensation for landowners. These payments are funded through international donations and nationwide taxes.

The second strategy has to do with selecting species for tree-planting. In theory, planting any kind of tree to produce more forest cover would absorb more carbon dioxide from the atmosphere. However, a genetically modified variant might grow much faster than unmodified specimens. Some of these cultivars are under development. Such fast-growing trees would be planted for harvest and can absorb carbon dioxide faster than slower-growing trees.

Impacts on temperature are affected by the location of the forest. For example, reforestation in boreal or subarctic regions has less impact on climate. This is because it substitutes a high-albedo, snow-dominated region with a lower-albedo forest canopy. By contrast, tropical reforestation projects lead to a positive change such as the formation of clouds. These clouds then reflect the sunlight, lowering temperatures.

Planting trees in tropical climates with wet seasons has another advantage. In such a setting, trees grow more quickly (fixing more carbon) because they can grow year-round. Trees in tropical climates have, on average, larger, brighter, and more abundant leaves than non-tropical climates. A study of the girth of 70,000 trees across Africa has shown that tropical forests fix more carbon dioxide pollution than previously realized. The research suggested almost one fifth of fossil fuel emissions are absorbed by forests across Africa, Amazonia and Asia. Simon Lewis stated, "Tropical forest trees are absorbing about 18% of the carbon dioxide added to the atmosphere each year from burning fossil fuels, substantially buffering the rate of change."

As of 2008 1.3 billion hectares of tropical regions were deforested every year. Reducing this would reduce the amount of planting needed to achieve a given degree of mitigation.

Methods 
A study finds that almost 300 million people live on tropical forest restoration opportunity land in the Global South, constituting a large share of low-income countries' populations, and argues for prioritized inclusion of "local communities" in forest restoration projects.

Using existing trees and roots 
Planting new trees often leads to up to 90% of seedlings failing. However, even in deforested areas, existing root systems often exist. Growth can be accelerated by pruning and coppicing where a few branches of new shoots are cut and often used for charcoal, itself a major driver of deforestation. Since new seeds are not planted, it is cheaper. Additionally, they are much more likely to survive as their root systems already exist and can tap into groundwater during harsher seasons with no rain. While this method has existed for centuries, it is now sometimes referred to as farmer-managed natural regeneration.

Financial incentives 

Policy that promote reforestation for incentives in return have shown promising results of being an effective and motivative concept to re-plant globally on a mass scale. Some incentives for reforestation can be as simple as a financial compensation. Streck and Scholz (2006) explain how a group of scientists from various institutions have developed a compensated reduction of deforestation approach which would reward developing countries that disrupt any further act of deforestation. Countries that participate and take the option to reduce their emissions from deforestation during a committed period of time would receive financial compensation for the carbon dioxide emissions that they avoided. To raise the payments, the host country would issue government bonds or negotiate some kind of loan with a financial institution that would want to take part in the compensation promised to the other country. The funds received by the country could be invested to help find alternatives to the extensive cutdown of forests. This whole process of cutting emissions would be voluntary, but once the country has agreed to lower their emissions they would be obligated to reduce their emissions. However, if a country was not able to meet their obligation, their target would get added to their next commitment period. The authors of these proposals see this as a solely government-to-government agreement; private entities would not participate in the compensation trades.

Another emerging revenue source to fund reforestation projects deals with the sale of carbon sequestration credits, which can be sold to companies and individuals looking to compensate their carbon footprint. This approach allows for private landowners and farmers to gain a revenue from the reforestation of their lands, while simultaneously benefiting from improved soil health and increased productivity.

Alongside past financial incentive strategies, reforestation tax benefits have been another way the government has encouraged companies to promote reforestation tactics through the promises of a tax break.

As many landholders seek to earn carbon credits through sequestration, their participation also encourages biodiversity and provides ecosystem services for crops and livestock.

Implementation

Global 
The 2020 World Economic Forum, held in Davos, announced the creation of the Trillion Tree Campaign, which is an initiative aiming to plant 1 trillion trees across the globe. The implementation can have big environmental and societal benefits but needs to be tailored to local conditions.  

The forest landscape restoration strategy seeks to rehabilitate landscapes and repair marginal and degraded areas in order to generate productive forest landscapes that are resilient and long-term. It aims to guarantee that diverse ecological and land-use functions are restored, safeguarded, and preserved over time.

Sub-Saharan Africa 

One plan in this region involves planting a nine-mile width of trees on the Southern Border of the Sahara Desert for stopping its expansion to the south. The Great Green Wall initiative is a pan-African proposal to "green" the continent from west to east in order to battle desertification.  It aims at tackling poverty (through employment of workers required for the project) and the degradation of soils in the Sahel-Saharan region, focusing on a strip of land that is 15 km (9 mi) wide and 7,500 km (4,750 mi) long from Dakar to Djibouti. As of May 2020, 21 countries joined the project, many of them are directly affected by the expansion of the Sahara desert. It should create 10 millions green jobs by 2030.

In 2019, Ethiopia begun a massive tree planting campaign "Green Legacy" with a target to plant 4 billion trees in one year. In one day only, over 350 million trees were planted.

Armenia 
The Armenia Tree Project was founded in 1994 to address environmental and economic concerns related to Armenia's dwindling forests. Since its founding, the organization has planted more than 6.5 million trees in communities throughout Armenia.

Costa Rica 
Through reforestation and environmental conservation, Costa Rica doubled its forest cover in 30 years.

Costa Rica has a long-standing commitment to the environment. The country is now one of the leaders of sustainability, biodiversity, and other protections. It wants to be completely fossil fuel free by 2050. The country has generated all of its electric power from renewable sources for three years as of 2019. It has committed to be carbon-free and plastic-free by 2021.

As of 2019, half of the country's land surface is covered with forests. They absorb a huge amount of carbon dioxide, combating climate change.

In the 1940s, more than 75% of the country was covered in mostly tropical rainforests and other indigenous woodlands. Between the 1940s and 1980s, extensive, uncontrolled logging led to severe deforestation. By 1983, only 26% of the country had forest cover. Realizing the devastation, policymakers took a stand. Through a continued environmental focus they were able to turn things around to the point that today forest cover has increased to 52%, two times more than 1983 levels.

An honorable world leader for ecotourism and conservation, Costa Rica has pioneered the development of payments for environmental services.  Costa Rica's extensive system of environmental protection has been encouraging conservation and reforestation of the land by providing grants for environmental services. The system is not just advanced for its time but is also unparalleled in the world. It received great international attention.

The country has established programs to compensate landowners for reforestation. One of the main programs established in Costa Rica was the Forest Promotion Certificate in 1979 and is funded by international donations and nationwide taxes. The initiative is helping to protect the forests in the country, and is now helped pass both the Forest Law in 1986 and FONAFIFO in 1990 which insures the continuity of the conservation programs.

Canada 
Natural Resources Canada (The Department of Natural Resources) states that the national forest cover was decreased by 0.34% from 1990 to 2015, and Canada has the lowest deforestation rate in the world. The forest industry is one of the main industries in Canada, which contributes about 7% of Canadian economy, and about 9% of the forests on earth are in Canada. Therefore, Canada has many policies and laws to commit to sustainable forest management. For example, 94% of Canadian forests are public land, and the government obligates planting trees after harvesting to public forests.

Peru 
Approximately 59% of Peru is covered by forest. A history of political turmoil and the government's inability to enforce environmental regulations has led to the degradation of the forest and environment in Peru. A military coup in 1968 caused a loss of economic mobility in the Talara region and sparked a boom in illegal logging due to the lack of alternative economic opportunities. Illegal mining and logging operations are responsible for a great deal of Peru's deforestation and environmental damage. The Peruvian government has not been able to enforce an environmentally conscious mining formalization plan to protect the Amazon forest in the Madre de Dios region. The 1980s were known in Peru as the “lost decade” due to a nationwide internal conflict and severe economic crisis almost destroying the country and resulting in the state losing control over several regions. Many areas in Peru, including Madre de Dios, had no state presence until the government initiated a movement to ‘conquer and populate the Amazon,’ with the hopes of minimizing illegal and informal mining operations that had expanded in the region and were polluting the Amazonian rivers and the destroying of its forests.

Reforestation initiatives have expanded in the country since. In Peru, reforestation is essential to preserving the livelihoods of rural communities because much of the population relies on the forest in some way. Deforestation also disproportionally affects indigenous communities in Peru, which is why reforestation efforts are essential for the protection of many communities' livelihoods.

China 

In China, extensive replanting programs have existed since the 1970s, which have had overall success. The forest cover has increased from 12% of China's land area to 16%. However, specific programs have had limited success. The "Green Wall of China", an attempt to limit the expansion of the Gobi Desert, is planned to be 2,800 miles (4,500 km) long and to be completed in 2050. China plans to plant 26 billion trees in the next decade; that is, two trees for every Chinese citizen per year. China requires that students older than 11 years old plant one tree a year until their high school graduation.

Between 2013 and 2018, China planted 338,000 square kilometres of forests, at a cost of $82.88 billion. By 2018, 21.7% of China's territory was covered by forests, a figure the government wants to increase to 26% by 2035. The total area of China is 9,596,961 square kilometres (see China), so 412,669 square kilometres more needs to be planted. According to the government's plan, by 2050, 30% of China’s territory should be covered by forests.

In 2017, the Saihanba Afforestation Community won the UN Champions of the Earth Award in the Inspiration and Action category for their successful reforestation efforts, which began upon discovering the survival of a single tree.

From 2016 to 2021, 3976 square kilometers of forests were planted in the Tibet Autonomous Region, with plans for 20 million trees to be planted before 2023.

In the years 2012-2022 China restored more than 70 million hectares (700,000 km2) of forests. China committed to plant and conserve 70 billion trees by the year 2030 as part of the Trillion Tree Campaign.

Launched in 1978 and scheduled to last until 2050, the Three Northern Protected Forest Development Program - informally known as the "Great Green Wall" - aims to eventually plant nearly 90 million acres of new forest in a 2,800-mile stretch of northern China.

Germany 

By the 14th century, forests in heavily populated areas had been devastated by industry, many of which required wood for their activities. Peter Stromer (1310-1388), lord of the Stromer trading and commercial company, was spurred by this shortage to "conduct forest culture experiments". In 1368 he successfully sowed fir and pine seeds in the Nuremberg Reichswald, which over time ended the wood shortage and established the "triumph of the pine in the Nuremberg Reichswald" (at the expense of other deciduous trees). The "doctrine of coniferous sowing" spread widely through forestry regulations and other writing at the time.

Reforestation is required as part of the federal forest law. 31% of Germany is forested, according to the second forest inventory of 2001–2003. The size of the forest area in Germany increased between the first and the second forest inventory due to forestation of degenerated bogs and agricultural areas.

India

Jadav Payeng had received national awards for reforestation efforts, known as the "Molai forest". He planted 1400 hectares of forest on the bank of river Brahmaputra alone.  There are active reforestation efforts throughout the country. In 2016, India had more than 50 million trees planted in Uttar Pradesh and in 2017, more than 66 million trees planted in Madhya Pradesh. In addition to this and individual efforts, there are startup companies, such as Afforest, that are being created over the country working on reforestation.
Lots of plantation are being carried out in the Indian continent but the survivability is very poor especially for massive plantations, with less than 20% survivability rate. To improve the forest cover and to achieve the national mission of forest cover of 33%, there is a need to improve the methods of plantation. Rather than mass planting, there is a need to work on performance measurement & tracking of trees growth. Taking this into consideration, a non-profit organisation Ek Kadam Sansthan in Jaipur is leading the development of a module of mass tracking for plantations. The pilot has been done successfully and the organisation is hoping to implement nationwide by the end of 2021.

Ireland 
In 2019 the government of Ireland decided to plant 440 million trees by 2040. The decision is part of the government's plan to make Ireland carbon neutral by 2050 with renewable energy, land use change and carbon tax.

Ireland is also driven to increase sustainable timber consumption while also adding more eco friendly work positions. They also have taken efforts to limit the use of methane emissions by signing a pledge to draw back methane use by 30%.

Israel 
Since 1948, large reforestation and afforestation projects were accomplished in Israel. 240 million trees have been planted. The carbon sequestration rate in these forests is similar to the European temperate forests.

Israel and only one other country was documented to have a net increase of forestation in the 2000's. This type of progress could be attributed to the social practices that Israel incorporates into their society.

Japan
The Ministry of Agriculture, Forestry and Fishery explain that about two-thirds of Japanese land is covered with forests, and it was almost unchanged from 1966 to 2012. Japan needs to reduce 26% of green house gas emission from 2013 by 2030 to accomplish Paris Agreement and is trying to reduce 2% of them by forestry.

Mass environmental and human-body pollution along with relating deforestation, water pollution, smoke damage, and loss of soils caused by mining operations in Ashio, Tochigi became the first environmental social issue in Japan, efforts by Shōzō Tanaka had grown to large campaigns against copper operation. This led to the creation of 'Watarase Yusuichi Pond', to settle the pollution which is a Ramsar site today. Reforestation was conducted as a part of afforestation due to inabilities of self-recovering by the natural land itself due to serious soil pollution and loss of woods consequence in loss of soils for plants to grow, thus needing artificial efforts involving introducing of healthy soils from outside. Starting from around 1897, about 50% of once bald mountains are now back to green.

Lebanon 
For thousands of years, Lebanon was covered by forests, one particular species of interest, Cedrus libani was exceptionally valuable and was almost eliminated due to lumbering operations. Virtually every ancient culture that shared the Mediterranean Sea harvested these trees from the Phoenicians who used cedar, pine and juniper to build their famous boats to the Romans, who cut them down for lime-burning kilns, to early in the 20th century when the Ottomans used much of the remaining cedar forests of Lebanon as fuel in steam trains. Despite two millennia of deforestation, forests in Lebanon still cover 13.6% of the country, and other wooded lands represent 11%.

Law No. 558, which was ratified by the Lebanese Parliament on April 19, 1996, aims to protect and expand existing forests, classifying all forests of cedar, fir, high juniper (juniperus excelsa), evergreen cypress (cupressus sempervirens) and other trees, whether diverse or homogeneous, whether state-owned or not as conserved forests.

Since 2011, more than 600,000 trees, including cedars and other native species, have been planted throughout Lebanon as part of the Lebanon Reforestation Initiative, which aims to restore Lebanon's native forests. Projects financed locally and by international charity are performing extensive reforestation of cedar being carried out in the Mediterranean region, particularly in Lebanon and Turkey, where over 50 million young cedars are being planted annually.

The Lebanon Reforestation Initiative has been working since 2012 with tree nurseries throughout Lebanon to help grow stronger tree seedlings that are better suited to survive once planted.

Pakistan 
The Billion Tree Tsunami was launched in 2014 by planting 10 billion trees, by the provincial government of Khyber Pakhtunkhwa (KPK) and Imran Khan, as a response to the challenge of global warming. Pakistan's Billion Tree Tsunami restored 350,000 hectares of forests and degraded land to surpass its Bonn Challenge commitment.

In 2018, Pakistan's prime minister Imran Khan declared that the country will plant 10 billion trees in the next five years.

In 2020, the Pakistani government launched an initiative to hire 63,600 laborers to plant trees in the northern Punjab region, with indigenous species such as acacia, mulberry and moringa. This initiative was meant to alleviate unemployment caused by lockdowns to mitigate the spread of COVID-19.

Philippines 

In 2011, the Philippines established the National Greening Program as a priority program to help reduce poverty, promote food security, environmental stability, and biodiversity conservation, as well as enhance climate change mitigation and adaptation in the country. The program paved the way for the planting of almost 1.4 billion seedlings in about 1.66 million hectares nationwide during the 2011-2016 period. The Food and Agriculture Organization of the United Nations ranked the Philippines fifth among countries reporting the greatest annual forest area gain, which reached 240,000 hectares during the 2010–2015 period.

Turkey 
Of the country's 78 million hectares of land in total the Ministry of Agriculture and Forestry aims to increase Turkey's forest cover to 30% by 2023.

4000 years ago Anatolia was 60% to 70% forested. Although the flora of Turkey remains more biodiverse than many European countries deforestation occurred during both prehistoric and historic times, including the Roman and Ottoman periods.

Since the first forest code of 1937 the official government definition of 'forest' has varied. According to the current definition 21 million hectares are forested, an increase of about 1 million hectares over the past 30 years, but only about half is 'productive'. However, according to the United Nations Food and Agriculture Organization definition of forest about 12 million hectares was forested in 2015, about 15% of the land surface.

The amount of greenhouse gas emissions by Turkey removed by forests is very uncertain. however a new assessment is being made with the help of satellites and new soil measurements and better information should be available by 2020.

According to the World Resources Institute "Atlas of Forest Landscape Restoration Opportunities" 50 million hectares are potential forest land, a similar area to the ancient Anatolian forest mentioned above. This could help limit climate change in Turkey. To help preserve the biodiversity of Turkey more sustainable forestry has been suggested. Improved rangeland management is also needed.

National Forestation Day is on 11 November but, according to the agriculture and forestry trade union although volunteers planted a record number of trees in 2019, most had died by 2020 in part due to lack of rainfall.

United States 

It is the stated goal of the US Forest Service (USFS) to manage forest resources sustainably. This includes reforestation after timber harvest, among other programs.

United States Department of Agriculture (USDA) data shows that forest occupied about 46% of total U.S. land in 1630 (when European settlers began to arrive in large numbers), but had decreased to 34% by 1910. After 1910, forest area has remained almost constant although U.S. population has increased substantially. In the late 19th century the U.S. Forest Service was established in part to address the concern of natural disasters due to deforestation, and new reforestation programs and federal laws such as the Knutson-Vandenberg Act (1930) were implemented. The U.S. Forest Service states that human-directed reforestation is required to support natural regeneration and the agency engages in ongoing research into effective ways to restore forests.

As for the year 2020, United States of America planted 2.5 billion trees per year. At the beginning of the year 2020, a bill that will increase the number to 3.3 billion, was proposed by the Republican Party, after President Donald Trump joined the Trillion Tree Campaign.

Organizations 

Ecosia is a non-profit organisation based in Berlin, Germany, that has planted over 100 million trees worldwide as of July 2020.

Trees for the Future has assisted more than 170,000 families, in 6,800 villages of Asia, Africa and the Americas, to plant over 35 million trees.

Ecologi is an organisation that offers its members ways to support climate change solutions. This includes offsetting their carbon emissions and tree planting. So far over 50 million trees have been planted through Ecologi, as well a more than 2.2 million tonnes of CO2e reduced.

Wangari Maathai, 2004 Nobel Peace Prize recipient, founded the Green Belt Movement which planted over 47 million trees to restore the Kenyan environment.

Shanghai Roots & Shoots, a division of the Jane Goodall Institute, launched The Million Tree Project in Kulun Qi, Inner Mongolia to plant one million trees to stop desertification and alleviate global warming.

Team Trees was a 2019 fundraiser with an initiative to plant 20 million trees. The initiative was started by American YouTubers MrBeast and Mark Rober, and was mostly supported by YouTubers. The Arbor Day Foundation will work with its local partners around the world to plant one tree for each dollar they raise.

Trees For Life (Brooklyn Park) is a state based organisation, which was established back in 1981 and delivers conservation, revegetation and community training programs. It now has thousands of active supporters and energizes activity within communities.

Many companies are trying to achieve carbon offsets by nature-based solutions like reforestation, including mangrove forests and soil restoration. Among them are Microsoft and Eni. Increasing the forest cover of Earth by 25% will offset the human emissions in the last 20 years. In any case it will be necessary to pull from the atmosphere the  that already have been emitted. However, this can work only if the companies will stop new emissions and stop deforestation.

Related concepts
A similar concept, afforestation, refers to the process of restoring and recreating areas of woodlands or forests that may have existed long ago but were deforested or otherwise removed at some point in the past or lacked it naturally (e.g., natural grasslands). Sometimes the term "re-afforestation" is used to distinguish between the original forest cover and the later re-growth of forest to an area. Special tools, e.g. tree planting bars, are used to make planting of trees easier and faster.

Another alternative strategy, proforestation, is similar as it can be used to counteract the negative environmental and ecological effects of deforestation through growing an existing forest intact to its full ecological potential.

Criticism

Competition with other land uses 
Reforestation competes with other land uses, such as food production, livestock grazing, and living space, for further economic growth. Reforestation can divert large amounts of water from other activities. A map created by the World Resources Institute in collaboration with the IUCN identifies 2 billion hectares for potential forest restoration. It is criticised for including 900 million hectares of grasslands.

Environmental risks 
Reforestation often has the tendency to create large fuel loads, resulting in significantly hotter combustion than fires involving low brush or grasses. Reduced harvesting rates and fire suppression have caused an increase in the forest biomass in the western United States over the past century. This causes an increase of about a factor of four in the frequency of fires due to longer and hotter dry seasons.

Effects on biodiversity 
Reforesting sometimes results in extensive canopy creation that prevents growth of diverse vegetation in the shadowed areas and generating soil conditions that hamper other types of vegetation. Trees used in some reforesting efforts (e.g., Eucalyptus globulus) tend to extract large amounts of moisture from the soil, preventing the growth of other plants. The European Commission found that, in terms of environmental services, it is better to avoid deforestation than to allow for deforestation to subsequently reforest, as the former leads to irreversible effects in terms of biodiversity loss and soil degradation.

The effects reforestation has on biodiversity is not limited to just other forms of vegetation, it can affect all forms of living organisms all contained in the present ecosystem. Due to the major role trees have on ecosystems it is important to better understand components like the ecosystem, waterways, and species present in areas that are being re-planted. Prior research helps limit the depletion of biodiversity which can hinder medicinal discoveries, and alter gene flow in organisms.

Carbon stocks 
There is also the risk that, through a forest fire or insect outbreak, much of the stored carbon in a reforested area could make its way back to the atmosphere. Furthermore, the probability that legacy carbon will be released from soil is higher in younger boreal forest. An example of this can be seen in the peatlands in Central Africa, which house an abundance of carbon in the mud called peat. Much like the forest fire or insect outbreak which can harm tropical rainforests, money can also be seen an incentive to harm forests and be paid off to protect it. The mudGlobal greenhouse gas emissions caused by damage to tropical rainforests may be underestimated by a factor of six. Additionally the effects of af- or reforestation will be farther in the future than those of proforestation. It takes much longer − several decades − for the benefits for global warming to manifest to the same carbon sequestration benefits from mature trees in tropical forests and hence from limiting deforestation. Some researchers note that instead of planting entirely new areas, reconnecting forested areas and restoring the edges of forest, to protect their mature core and make them more resilient and longer-lasting, should be prioritized.

See also 

 10,000 Trees for the Rouge Valley, a reforestation program in Toronto, Canada
 Aerial reforestation
 Agricultural robots
 Armenia Tree Project
 Richard St. Barbe Baker
 Drone-based reforestation
 E-tenders for carbon sink restoration
 Forest gardening
 Forest restoration
 Forestry
 Greenland Arboretum
 Hemp
 Hoedads Reforestation Cooperative
 Jewish National Fund
 Land rehabilitation
 Mangrove restoration
 The Man Who Planted Trees
 Natural landscape
 One Earth Climate Model
 Plant A Tree Today Foundation
 Pottiputki
 Restoration ecology
 Revegetation
 Rewilding (conservation biology)
 Tree credits
 Tree planting
 Tubestock
 UN Decade on Ecosystem Restoration
 Urban reforestation
 Wood economy

References

Sources

Further reading

External links 

 "Perpetual Timber Supply Through Reforestation as Basis For Industrial Permanency: The Story Of Bogalusa" By Courtenay De Kalb, July 1921
 Saimiri Wildlife; Reforestation for endangered wildlife.
 Trees and climate change: a practical guide for woodland owners and managers
 Shanghai Roots & Shoots - Million Tree Project
 Reforestation Information

 
Reforest
Forest management
Habitat
Emissions reduction
Carbon dioxide removal